I Need Your Lovin' (also: "Need Your Lovin'") is a popular rhythm and blues song written by Bobby Robinson and Don Gardner. Gardner, teamed up with singer Dee Dee Ford and scored a Top 20 hit with the song in 1962. The song was unusual at the time in that it was a 5:45 two-part composition, but it was Part 2 that got the airplay. The song also featured a full false ending during the second half, coming to a complete stop and then starting up again, much in the manner of African American gospel music of the era, in which the singer who surged beyond the "ending" of the song implied that the Holy Spirit is so strong that it cannot be stopped by mere musical convention.

"I Need Your Lovin'" has been covered by many artists including Otis Redding, on his debut 1964 album Pain in My Heart; and Tom Jones (the latter on his Along Came Jones, 1965 debut album).

References

1962 songs
1962 singles